Journey to Self is a 2012 Nigerian drama film written and produced by Ashionye Michelle Raccah and directed by Tope Oshin, starring Nse Ikpe Etim, Ashionye Michelle Raccah, Dakore Akande, Tosin Sido and Katherine Obiang. It received a nomination for the category Achievement In Soundtrack at the 9th Africa Movie Academy Awards.
The film tells a story of 5 childhood friends who converge at the home of one of them who just died, she leaves a series of letters that explains her struggles through life and eventually leading to their "self discovery".

Plot
The film tells a story of 5 childhood friends that converge at the home of the deceased Uche reading a series of letters she left that explains her struggles through life and eventually leading to their self-discovery.

Rume (Katherine Obiang) is married to a man, whom she later discovered was a "crossdresser", she filed for divorce after several attempt to make him normal proved abortive. however he pleaded with her to stage infidelity as the reason for the divorce to avoid disgrace and societal outrage from family and friends for his eccentric lifestyle.

Uche (Tosin Sido) was married off by her dad as the 4th wife to a former business colleague as a remedy for an unpaid debt. As soon as it was revealed that she was barren, she began suffering an emotional breakdown caused by her much older husband and his jealous wives.

Regina (Ashionye Michelle Raccah) is a full housewife that is being assaulted by her husband, Their 2 kids were also affected by the domestic violence.

Nse (Nse Ikpe Etim) had a son when she was younger and her husband is yet to know about it.

Alex (Dakore Akande) is an entertainment celebrity that has been very unlucky with men taking advantage of her tenderheartedness.

Cast
Nse Ikpe Etim as Nse
Ashionye Michelle Raccah as Regina
Dakore Akande as Alex
Katherine Obiang as Rume
Tosin Sido as Uche
Chris Attoh as Dapo
Femi Brainard as David
Femi Jacobs as Uzo
Adeyemi Okanlawon as Benjamin
Kalu Ikeagwu as Joe

Reception
Journey to Self received mixed to positive reviews from critics with Nollywood Reinvented giving it a 54% rating. The reviewer described the film as not fitting into the typical Nollywood formula. "Just because it’s not what we’re used to doesn’t make it a bad movie. It had a point to convey, it sent that point home and it ended. Simple and short." Sodas and Popcorn gave it 4 out of 5 rating and states "It has a strong message about self-discovery, being independent, standing up for yourself. The best part is the fact that the movie succeeds in communicating all these lessons effectively."  "I had an eighteen month old baby to raise and a husband who doesn't know whether he wants to be a mummy or a daddy" has been noted as being a memorable line from the movie.

Awards

See also
 List of Nigerian films of 2012

References

External links

2012 films
English-language Nigerian films
Nigerian drama films
Films set in Lagos
Films set in Abuja
Films shot in Lagos
2012 drama films
2010s English-language films